Nina Sergeevna Golubkova (January 28, 1932 in Leningrad – August 24, 2009 in Saint Petersburg) was a Russian lichenologist.

In 1955, after graduating from Leningrad State University with a degree in mycology, Golubkova joined the Komarov Botanical Institute, where she worked under the supervision of Vsevolod Savich. In the 1960s, she studied specimens which had been retrieved during various Soviet expeditions to the Antarctic; her research on these samples led to multiple scientific publications and the identification of several new species. She also participated in specimen-collecting expeditions to the Pamir Mountains in Tajikistan, and to the steppes, taiga, and desert of Mongolia, and in 1978, she was a contributor to volume 5 of the Handbook of Lichens of the USSR.

In 1982, Golubkova was promoted to director of the Institute's Lichenology and Bryology Laboratory, a position she retained for over 20 years. In the aftermath of the dissolution of the Soviet Union, she arranged for the publication of volumes 6 through 10 of the now-renamed Handbook of Lichens of Russia, of which she served as editor-in-chief.

In 2000, Golubkova was awarded the Acharius Medal for lifetime achievements in lichenology.

Two lichen species, Chaenothecopsis golubkovae and Catillaria golubkovae, and the lichen genus Golubkovia, have been named in her honor.

References

1932 births
2009 deaths
Russian lichenologists
Acharius Medal recipients
Honoured Scientists of the Russian Federation
Scientists from Saint Petersburg
Saint Petersburg State University alumni
20th-century Russian botanists
Russian women botanists
20th-century Russian women scientists
Soviet botanists
Soviet women scientists
21st-century Russian botanists
Soviet mycologists